The discography of Acceptance, an American alternative rock band, consists of two studio albums, four extended plays, and five singles.

Albums

Studio albums

Extended plays

Singles

References

Discographies of American artists